John Purves may refer to:
 John Purves (ice hockey), Canadian ice hockey player
 John Purves (politician), Australian politician
 John Archibald Purves, English electrical engineer
 Tug John Purves, a museum boat

See also
 John-Clay Purves, British geologist and museum curator
 Captain John Purves and His Wife (1775), portrait by American painter Henry Benbridge